Rick's List is a news and commentary program on CNN hosted by Rick Sanchez. The show aired weekdays from 3 to 5 PM EST.  It first aired on Monday, January 18, 2010, when Sanchez's one-hour CNN Newsroom shift was lengthened to two hours and given its own title, and The Situation Room with Wolf Blitzer was moved one hour later. Its last broadcast was on Friday, October 1, 2010 when CNN fired Sanchez over controversial comments made on a radio show.

As with Sanchez's previous broadcast, Rick's List focuses on using social networking including Twitter to create a "national conversation" about the news. One continuing segment was called "The List U Don't Want 2 Be On," in which he criticizes others' actions and comments.

Primetime
Starting on Thursday, July 22, 2010, an hour-long primetime edition of Rick's List, entitled Primetime, was added as an interim replacement for Campbell Brown until the premiere of its replacement, Parker Spitzer.

References 

CNN original programming
2010 American television series debuts
2010 American television series endings
2010s American television news shows